Paul Anthony Annett (18 February 1937 - 11 December 2017) was an English film and television director.

Biography
Annett directed numerous television programmes including Poldark and EastEnders.

His daughter is actress Chloë Annett.

He died on 11 December 2017 and was buried on the eastern side of Highgate Cemetery.

Films directed
 The Beast Must Die, 1974

Television directed
 Poldark (first series)
 Grange Hill
 Secret Army
 Within These Walls
 The Adventure of Sherlock Holmes (three episodes)
 Emmerdale
 Brookside 1997
 Byker Grove
 EastEnders

References

External links 
 

1937 births
2017 deaths
Burials at Highgate Cemetery
People from Kensington
English film directors
English television directors